Operaatio Hurrikaani (Operation Hurricane) is an interactive combination of a television show and a website that has been produced by YLE (Finnish Broadcasting Company). Its anticipated target audience is 7-12 year olds.

Plot
Puuma (Puma) is a young individual who leads a double life; everybody thinks he's studying to become a teacher, but he's a top secret agent. He has to fight against Tohtori Routa (Dr. Freeze) and his evil plans. Puuma gets help from his curious aunt Sirkku, from an older agent Postimies and from a beautiful and hardworking girlagent Kleopatra.

How it works
Each week the TV-show has a drama episode, which ends with a question and three alternatives.

After that kids can log on to the website and help Puuma by giving their answer. Doing so they earn themselves a new mini-game, which they can use to train their skills as a secret agent. They also have an avatar, which can be modified by changing clothes, hair styles and spy gear.

Then on the TV-show at the following week, the correct answer for the question is shown.

There's a prize draw for all participating agents. The winners are shown as the avatars they have created online in the weekly TV show.

Cast

 Tomi Alatalo as Puuma "Puma"
 Iina Suominen as Sirkku
 Olli Löytönen as Postimies "Postman"
 Hanna Salo as Kleopatra
 Maria Isotalo as Aleksandra
 Olli Mononen as Routa "Dr. Freeze"

Seasons

1st season, episodes 1-20
Aired 2007

2nd season, episodes 21-40
Aired 2008

3rd season, episodes 41-50
Aired 2009

4th season, episodes 51-70
Aired 2009-2010

References

External links
 http://www.yle.fi/operaatiohurrikaani/

Finnish children's television series